"Night Moves" is a song by American singer Marilyn Martin, which was released in 1986 as the lead single from her debut studio album Marilyn Martin. The song was written by Martin, John Parr and Jon Astley, and produced by Astley and Phil Chapman. "Night Moves" peaked at No. 28 on the US Billboard Hot 100.

Background
"Night Moves" followed the success of "Separate Lives", a duet Martin recorded with Phil Collins in 1985 for the soundtrack of the film White Nights. "Separate Lives" peaked at No. 1 on the US Billboard Hot 100 and Canada RPM 100, and reached the top 5 in the UK Singles Chart. "Night Moves" continued Martin's commercial success, reaching No. 28 on the Billboard Hot 100 in March 1986, but was her last entry in the chart.

In 1986, Martin revealed to Cash Box of the decision to release "Night Moves" as the first single from her debut album, "I think aggressive is the best word to describe my style. Aggressive music with a rock edge is what I tend to like most. That's primarily the reason we came out with a rock-oriented cut like 'Night Moves' as the first single, because it's exactly the sort of song I like recording most at this point."

Speaking to Songfacts in 2016, co-writer John Parr recalled of the song, "We were working on another track and during the break we were just running a few ideas and out came that song. Jon Astley later came aboard as producer and gave it a far more generic '80s vibe. Jon's a great producer but personally I think it dates the song when you listen now."

Music video
The song's music video was directed by Jim Yukich and produced by Paul Flattery, both of whom had previously worked with Martin on the video for "Separate Lives". The video for "Night Moves" received heavy rotation on MTV, and peaked at No. 9 on the Cash Box Top 30 Music Videos chart in April 1986.

Martin said of the video in a 1986 interview with the New York Daily News, "I love the video. It's based on one of my favorite movies, The Hunger. I've always loved scary movies... and it's tough for a girl to be shocking in videos. Michael Jackson can become a werewolf, but girls don't. I even got to put in a few suggestions of my own, like the scene where I tilt a head so I can bite the neck. I thought that was necessary to show I was just a vampire, not a mass murderer."

In addition to the video, Martin performed "Night Moves" on American Bandstand, which was broadcast on March 29, 1986. She also performed the song on the Dutch TopPop.

Critical reception
On its release, Billboard described the song as a "two-fisted rocker" which "could easily pass for a leaf from the Benatar songbook". Jan DeKnock of the Chicago Tribune wrote, "On 'Night Moves', Martin displays another side to her voice, showing enough rock power to rival Pat Benatar (their high notes sound eerily alike)." Music & Media picked the song as one of their "records of the week" during February 1986 and described it as "a very strong AOR-based song that could do very well in Europe". They added, "The single is definitely not a continuation of the sound on 'Separate Lives'. [It] features a vocal cross section between Pat Benatar and Olivia Newton-John". Jim Schembri of The Age described the song as "a prim, catchy atmosphere piece about sex". He added, "The slightly bizarre bent of the lyrics are given free reign in the terrific [video] which is an economy sized thriller with a wonderfully gruesome surprise ending."

Track listing
7–inch single
"Night Moves" – 4:24
"Wildest Dreams" – 4:29

7–inch single (US promo)
"Night Moves" – 4:24
"Night Moves" – 4:24

12–inch single (UK and Germany release)
"Night Moves" – 5:18
"Wildest Dreams" – 4:29

12–inch single (US promo)
"Night Moves" (Vocal/Faded LP Version) – 4:24
"Night Moves" (Vocal/Faded LP Version) – 4:24

Personnel
Production
 Jon Astley, Phil Chapman – producers
 George Marino – mastering

Other
 Brian Aris – photography

Charts

References

1986 songs
1986 singles
Atlantic Records singles
Songs written by John Parr